Burches Run Wildlife Management Area, formerly Burches Run Lake WMA, is located on  near Wheeling in Marshall County, West Virginia. Until 2005 the wildlife management area contained a lake impounded by a dam at risk of failure. The name change occurred after the dam was removed.  The terrain climbs gently above Burches Run and is covered by a mature oak-hickory second-growth forest.

Directions
Big Wheeling Creek Road is accessed near the intersection of US Route 40 and I-70 at Elm Grove.

This map shows the WMA and where the lake that was removed used to be.

Hunting
Hunting opportunities, limited by the small size of the area, include deer, squirrel, and water fowl. Camping is prohibited at this WMA.

See also
Animal conservation
Buffalo Creek Flood
List of dam failures
List of West Virginia wildlife management areas

References

External links
 West Virginia DNR District 1 Wildlife Management Areas
West Virginia Hunting Regulations
West Virginia Fishing Regulations

Wildlife management areas of West Virginia
Protected areas of Marshall County, West Virginia
IUCN Category V